Nava del Rey is a municipality located in the province of Valladolid, Castile and León, Spain. According to the 2004 census (INE), the municipality has a population of 2,127 inhabitants.

Transportation 
Nava del Rey has a station on the Medina del Campo-Zamora Railway, providing passenger on the RENFE Media Distancia service #18 from Zamora to Valladolid.

References

Municipalities in the Province of Valladolid